Adam I (Edem Efiom Ededem Edak Edem Etim Efiom Okoho Efiom Ekpo Efiom Ekpo; ca. 1849  – 1 July 1906) was the Obong of Calabar, Nigeria from 1901 until his death on 1 July 1906.

Adam was born in Calabar, sometime around the reign of his 2nd cousin thrice removed  Archibong I as the Obong of Calabar and its dependencies. He was the eldest son of Ephraim Adam of Etim Efiom royal house of Old Calabar. His mother Akwa Edem Itu was from Big Qua Town in the present-day Calabar.

Early life
Obong Adam Ephraim Adam was born as "Edem Efiom Ededem". Although not much is known regarding his early life, He grew up under the care of his Father Ephraim Adam (Alias Tete), and his mother Akwa Edem Itu. Several records reveal that he was well educated having mastery of the Efik and the English language. On the death of his father in 1874, his aunty Queen Duke (Afiong Umo Edem) took control of the Ephraim Adam household. Adam was brought up under her tutelage and assumed the headship of his father's house after the death of Queen Duke in 1888. As a member of the Ekpe society, he held the Ekpe grade Murua Nkanda.

Kingship 
Prior to the ascension of Adam I to the stool of the Obong of Old Calabar, there was an interregnum within the leadership of Old Calabar. The interregnum began after the death of Obong Orok Edem Odo. The main cause of the interregnum was Prince Asibong Edem's vested interests in the stool of the Obong of Old Calabar. Due to disagreements in Calabar, Prince Asibong Edem left Calabar in Annoyance and moved to the present-day Asibong Town. In September 1900, Prince Asibong returned to Calabar and after much pressure was selected to be the Obong of Old Calabar. However, Prince Asibong died on September 21, 1900, which led to the initial preferred choice of Adam as the most suitable candidate.

Administration 

The reign of Adam I was not easy as with more involvement from the colonial officers, the powers of the Obong were greatly limited. Nevertheless, the Kings of Old Calabar cooperated with the colonial officers to protect the interests of the Efik people. Adam I was a member of the Native Council of Old Calabar. These native councils set up by the High Commissioner Sir C. M. Macdonald in 1895 operated as the administrative and judicial body of Calabar. Obong Adam I was also present at the opening of Watt Market in 1901.

Ancestry

Notes

References

Bibliography 
 .
 .
 
 
 .
 .
 .
  .
 .

External links 
 

Nigerian traditional rulers
Calabar
History of Nigeria
19th-century Nigerian people
20th-century Nigerian people
1840s births
1906 deaths
Year of birth uncertain
People of Efik descent